Cyrtinus fauveli is a species of beetle in the family Cerambycidae. It was described by Cameron in 1909. It is known from Haiti.

References

Cyrtinini
Beetles described in 1909